Autoroute 199 is a small French motorway connecting Noisy-le-Grand to Torcy. At Noisiel, there is access to the A4 autoroute and N104. Though previously designated "H3", it has been downgraded into "RD 199".

Junction

01 (Torcy) km 0 Towns served: Torcy
02 (Val Maubuée) Towns served:
00 (Noisiel) Towns served: Noisiel
00 (Champs-sur-Marne) Towns served: Champs-sur-Marne
00 Exchange A199-RN370 Road becomes the RN370 to Noisy-le-Grand.

References

External links
 A199 Motorway in Saratlas

A199